Katarzynki Toruń, known as Energa Katarzynki Toruń for sponsorship reasons, is a Polish professional women's basketball club that was founded in 2005 in the city of Toruń. They play in the Basket Liga Kobiet, the highest competition in Poland. In the 2017-18 season the team is also played in the EuroCup Women.

Titles
 Polish Championship:
 3rd place (3): 2010, 2012, 2015

Current roster

References

External links
 Official Website

Women's basketball teams in Poland
Sport in Toruń
Basketball teams established in 2005